Echinopla is a genus of ants in the subfamily Formicinae. The genus is distributed from Singapore and Sumatra (Indonesia) to the Philippines, Papua New Guinea and Australia.

Species

Echinopla arfaki Donisthorpe, 1943
Echinopla australis Forel, 1901
Echinopla cherapunjiensis Bharti & Gul, 2012
Echinopla corrugata Donisthorpe, 1943
Echinopla crenulata Donisthorpe, 1941
Echinopla deceptor Smith, 1863
Echinopla densistriata Stitz, 1938
Echinopla dubitata Smith, 1862
Echinopla lineata Mayr, 1862
Echinopla maeandrina Stitz, 1938
Echinopla melanarctos Smith, 1857
Echinopla mistura (Smith, 1860)
Echinopla nitida Smith, 1863
Echinopla octodentata Stitz, 1911
Echinopla pallipes Smith, 1857
Echinopla praetexta Smith, 1860
Echinopla pseudostriata Donisthorpe, 1943
Echinopla rugosa André, 1892
Echinopla serrata (Smith, 1859)
Echinopla silvestrii Donisthorpe, 1936
Echinopla striata Smith, 1857
Echinopla tritschleri Forel, 1901
Echinopla turneri Forel, 1901
Echinopla vermiculata Emery, 1898

References

External links

Formicinae
Ant genera